Francisca Alejandra Lara Lara (born 29 July 1990), informally known as Pancha Lara, is a Chilean professional footballer who plays as a midfielder for Spanish Liga F club Villarreal CF and the Chile women's national team.

International career
Twenty-year-old Lara was named in Chile's 20-player squad for the 2010 South American Women's Football Championship in Ecuador. She scored two goals at the 2018 Copa América Femenina, where Chile qualified to a FIFA Women's World Cup for the first time in its history.

International goals
Scores and results list Chile's goal tally first

References

External links 
 

1990 births
Living people
People from San Fernando, Chile
Chilean women's footballers
Women's association football midfielders
Ferroviarios footballers
Coquimbo Unido footballers
Cobreloa footballers
Colo-Colo (women) footballers
Primera División (women) players
Sporting de Huelva players
Sevilla FC (women) players
Chile women's international footballers
Footballers at the 2011 Pan American Games
Pan American Games competitors for Chile
Competitors at the 2014 South American Games
South American Games silver medalists for Chile
South American Games medalists in football
Chilean expatriate women's footballers
Chilean expatriate sportspeople in Spain
Expatriate women's footballers in Spain
2019 FIFA Women's World Cup players
Footballers at the 2020 Summer Olympics
Olympic footballers of Chile
Villarreal CF (women) players